The 2022 Beach Break was the second annual Beach Break professional wrestling television special produced by All Elite Wrestling (AEW). The two-part event was broadcast as special episodes of AEW's weekly television programs, Wednesday Night Dynamite and Friday Night Rampage. It took place on January 26, 2022, at Wolstein Center in Cleveland, Ohio. Dynamite aired live on TBS while Rampage aired on tape delay on TNT on January 28.

In the main event of the Dynamite broadcast, Orange Cassidy defeated Adam Cole in a Lights Out match, which also saw the AEW debut of Danhausen. The opening bout was a ladder match for the AEW TNT Championship, in which interim champion Sammy Guevara defeated lineal champion Cody Rhodes to become the undisputed TNT Champion, in what was Rhodes' final match in AEW. In the main event of the Rampage broadcast, Jurassic Express (Jungle Boy and Luchasaurus) defeated Private Party (Marq Quen and Isiah Kassidy) to retain the AEW World Tag Team Championship.

Production

Background
In February 2021, All Elite Wrestling (AEW) held a television special titled Beach Break, which aired as a special episode of Dynamite. The event replaced Bash at the Beach as the promotion's midwinter beach-themed event. A second Beach Break was scheduled for late January 2022 to air as a two-part event as special episodes of Dynamite and Rampage, thus establishing Beach Break as an annual event. It was scheduled to be held on January 26, 2022, at the Wolstein Center in Cleveland, Ohio. Dynamite aired live on TBS while Rampage aired on tape delay on TNT on January 28.

Storylines
Beach Break featured professional wrestling matches that involved different wrestlers from pre-existing scripted feuds and storylines. Wrestlers portrayed heroes, villains, or less distinguishable characters in scripted events that built tension and culminated in a wrestling match or series of matches. Storylines were produced on AEW's weekly television programs, Dynamite and Rampage, the supplementary online streaming shows, Dark and Elevation, and The Young Bucks' YouTube series Being The Elite.

During the special Holiday Bash episode of Rampage on December 25, 2021, Cody Rhodes defeated Sammy Guevara to become a record three-time AEW TNT Champion. The two were scheduled to have a rematch for the championship at Battle of the Belts I on January 8, 2022; however, Cody was pulled from the event as he had been in contact with family who had tested positive for COVID-19, thus requiring him to quarantine. Guevara instead faced and defeated Cody's brother Dustin Rhodes at that event to become the interim champion. On the January 19 episode of Dynamite, lineal champion Cody challenged interim champion Guevara to a ladder match at the Dynamite broadcast of Beach Break to determine the undisputed TNT Champion.

Results

Reception 
Dave Meltzer of the Wrestling Observer Newsletter gave the ladder match between Cody Rhodes and Sammy Guevara a 5 star rating.

Television ratings 
Dynamite averaged 1,100,000 television viewers on TBS, with a 0.41 rating in the key demographic.

Rampage averaged 601,000 television viewers on TNT, with a 0.25 rating in the key demographic.

References

External links

AEW Beach Break
2020s American television specials
2022 American television episodes
2022 in professional wrestling
January 2022 events in the United States
Events in Cleveland